The 1962–63 season was Port Vale's 51st season of football in the English Football League, and their fourth season in the Third Division. An impressive season saw them finish in third position, one away from promotion. However promotions for both their rivals Stoke City (second to first tier) and Crewe Alexandra (fourth to third tier) meant that Vale had a poor season in comparison. The major talking point of the season was Norman Low's departure and Freddie Steele's return, which came as a shock to the fans.

Overview

Third Division
The pre-season saw the arrival of John Rowland, a 'tall and skilful' outside-right from Nottingham Forest for £6,000.

The season opened with six points from four games, with three clean sheets to boot. Rowland was dropped from the first eleven following a 2–0 defeat at Ashton Gate on 1 September. Vale then became inconsistent, and so Low added young forward Terry Harkin to the squad from Coleraine, and transfer-listed Stan Steele after he began to be targeted by hecklers at Vale Park. Despite beating Southend United 5–1, the club continued to sink down the table. They then began a nine-game unbeaten streak on 20 October with a 1–1 draw with Carlisle United at Brunton Park. However ten days later manager Norman Low tendered his resignation, to the shock of fans and pundits. Low cited disagreements with the board as the reason for his departure. The club felt they needed a marquee signing and so approached first Tom Finney and then European cup winning coach Béla Guttmann, who had just departed Benfica, both declined the role. Low's successor instead proved to be his predecessor, Freddie Steele, in another development that took many by surprise. Roy Sproson later noted "He [Steele] had changed. He had not got the enthusiasm or drive as before, but the lads still responded to him".

It took until the sixth game of Steele's reign for a goal to be conceded (525 minutes) as 'the Steele Curtain' again descended upon Vale Park. The goal was scored by former Valiant turned bogey player Ronnie Allen for Crystal Palace in a 4–1 home win for Vale. They finished the year chasing promotion, despite losing 4–3 to Reading at Elm Park. No league games were played in January or February due to the Big Freeze. To help with finances during this spell of two months without competitive action, Bert Llewellyn was sold to Northampton Town for £7,000 and Arthur Longbottom was sold to Millwall for £2,000. Back in action in March, Steele found his offence wanting, and so purchased Tony Richards from Walsall for £9,000. Richards immediately impacted himself on the club's scoring charts, eventually finishing as top-scorer for his two months work. For the four weeks following 20 April, Vale recorded eight wins from their final ten matches, though this would prove to be too little to late as far as promotion was concerned.

They finished in third spot with 54 points, four short of promotion, though enough to earn them £500 in talent money. Their 58 goals conceded total was fewer only than Swindon Town.

Finances
On the financial side, a profit of £2,275 was made despite an operating loss of £20,557. A donation from the Sportsmen's Association and social club stood at a highly impressive £22,832. Whilst wages remained fairly constant at £33,120, gate receipts had fallen by £8,000. The club's overdraft stood at £41,000, leading to a discussion over whether or not to take out a mortgage on Vale Park. The club management took the decision to replace the black and amber kit with the traditional white shirts, black shorts and black and white socks – the kit Steele's men triumphed in almost ten years previously. On the playing front, Peter Ford's departure to Macclesfield Town was the only transfer of note.

Cup competitions
In the FA Cup, Vale took their revenge upon Bristol Rovers, dumping them out of the competition at the first stage with a 2–0 win at Burslem on 21 November. Three weeks later Aldershot suffered the same fate, in what was Sproson's 500th appearance for the club. In the Third Round they beat Fourth Division Gillingham 4–2 at Priestfield. They then lost 2–1 to First Division Sheffield United in front of 22,207 rain-soaked supporters.

In the League Cup, Bristol Rovers won the  First Round clash at the Memorial Stadium 2–0.

League table

Results
Port Vale's score comes first

Football League Third Division

Results by matchday

Matches

FA Cup

League Cup

Player statistics

Appearances

Top scorers

Transfers

Transfers in

Transfers out

Loans out

References
Specific

General

Port Vale F.C. seasons
Port Vale